The Rural Municipality of Poplar Valley No. 12 is a rural municipality (RM) in the Canadian province of Saskatchewan within Census Division No. 3 and  Division No. 2. It is located in the southern portion of the province. It is adjacent to the United States border, neighbouring Daniels County in Montana.

History 
The RM of Poplar Valley No. 12 incorporated as a rural municipality on January 1, 1913.

Geography

Communities and localities 
The following urban municipalities are surrounded by the RM.
Towns
 Rockglen

The following unincorporated communities are within the RM.
Localities
 Fife Lake

The following parks are within the RM.
Regional parks
 Rockin Beach Park

Demographics 

Government 
The RM of Poplar Valley No. 12 is governed by an elected municipal council and an appointed administrator that meets on the second Wednesday of every month. Current  reeve is Darrel Swanson, while its administrator is Lynn Fisher.

Sitting Councellors as of the 2020 election are:

Terry Loucks - Division 1
Kalissa Regier - Division 2
Richard Kimball - Division 3
Kendra Loucks - Division 4
Brad Christopherson - Division 5
Calvin Knoss - Division 6

Transportation 
The RM is a part owner of the Fife Lake Railway.
 Rockglen Airport
 Highway 2
 Highway 18

References 

 
Poplar Valley
Division No. 3, Saskatchewan